Wyatt is a male given name, derived from the Norman surname Guyot, derived from "widu", Proto-Germanic for "wood".

Notable people with the given name "Wyatt" include

A
Wyatt Agar (born 1981), American politician
Wyatt Aiken (1863–1923), American politician
Wyatt Allen (born 1979), American rower
Wyatt Anderson (born 1939), American biologist

B
Wyatt Bardouille, American filmmaker
Wyatt Rainey Blassingame (1909–1985), American author
Wyatt Borso (born 2004), American soccer player
Wyatt Brichacek (born 2000), American racing driver

C
Wyatt Cenac (born 1976), American television correspondent
Wyatt Emory Cooper (1927–1978), American author
Wyatt Creech (born 1946), New Zealand politician
Wyatt Crockett (born 1983), New Zealand rugby player

D
Wyatt Davis (born 1999), American football player
Wyatt Durrette (disambiguation), multiple people

E
Wyatt Earp (1848–1929), American teamster
Wyatt Eaton (1849–1896), Canadian-American painter

G
Wyatt Gallery, American photographer
Wyatt George Gibson (1790–1862), British banker
Wyatt Gooden (born 1988), American racing driver
Wyatt Gould (1879–1960), Welsh rugby union footballer

H
Wyatt C. Hedrick (1888–1964), American architect
Wyatt Henderson (born 1956), American football player
Wyatt Houston (born 1994), American football player
Wyatt Hubert (born 1998), American football player

J
Wyatt F. Jeltz (1907–1975), American educator
Wyatt Johnston (born 2003), Canadian ice hockey player
Wyatt Jones (born 1970), American canoeist

K
Wyatt Kalynuk (born 1997), Canadian ice hockey player
Wyatt Knight (1955–2011), American actor

M
Wyatt Mason (born 1969), American journalist
Wyatt Mathisen (born 1993), American baseball player
Wyatt Miller (born 1995), American football player
Wyatt Mills (born 1995), American baseball player

N
Wyatt Nash (born 1988), American television personality

O
Wyatt Oleff (born 2003), American actor
Wyatt Omsberg (born 1995), American soccer player
Wyatt Outlaw (1820–1870), American politician

P
Wyatt Papworth (1822–1894), English architect
Wyatt Prunty (born 1947), American poet

R
Wyatt Ray (born 1996), American football player
Wyatt Rice (born 1965), American guitarist
Wyatt Roy (born 1990), Australian politician
Wyatt Russell (born 1986), American actor
Wyatt Ruther (1923–1999), American bassist

S
Wyatt Sanford (born 1998), Canadian boxer
Wyatt Sexton (born 1984), American football player
Wyatt Smith (born 1977), American ice hockey player
Wyatt A. Stewart, American businessman

T
Wyatt Teller (born 1994), American football player
Wyatt Toregas (born 1982), American baseball player
Wyatt Townley (born 1954), American poet
Wyatt Tremblay (born 1960), Canadian cartoonist
Wyatt Turner (1909–1986), American baseball player

W
Wyatt Tee Walker (1928–2018), American pastor
Wyatt Webb (1941–2003), American basketball coach
Wyatt C. Whitley (1900–1982), American chemist
Wyatt Worthington II (born 1987), American golfer

Fictional characters
Wyatt Spencer, a character on the soap opera The Bold and the Beautiful
Wyatt Wingfoot, a character in the comic book series Marvel Comics

See also
Wyatt (surname), a page for people with the surname "Wyatt"
Wyatt (disambiguation), a disambiguation page for "Wyatt"

References

Given names
English masculine given names